The wildlife of Azerbaijan consists of its flora and fauna and their natural habitats.

The symbol of fauna in Azerbaijan is the Karabakh horse (Azeri: Qarabağ atı) which is a mountain-steppe racing and riding horse which can be found only in Azerbaijan. It is one of the oldest breeds, with ancestry dating to the ancient world. The horse was originally developed in the Karabakh region in the 5th century and is named after it.

The natural habitat of various types of animals in Azerbaijan is diverse. Some species only populate specific areas (lakes, parts of mountainous areas) while others are spread throughout the country. For example, passerines can be found throughout the whole of Azerbaijan. Protozoa parasites are also registered in all areas of the country, depending on natural habitat of carrier animals (cattle, poultry, etc.). Among mammals, gazelles populate the plains, Caucasian goat inhabits the major Caucasus areas, and most species of birds can be found in forests or water basins. Pest insects can be found in agricultural fields, while others populate defined biotopes only.

A number of natural preserves have been created and the hunting rules were brought into effect for protection of fur and hoofed animals in Azerbaijan.

Fauna

Azerbaijan's animal kingdom owes its diversity to the variety of climates and biomes that can be found within Azerbaijani territory.

Mammals

Azerbaijan has the highest number of mammal species in Europe. Some 107 species of mammals have been recorded in Azerbaijan, three of which are unique to the country. Well-known species include Caucasian goats and west-Caucasus mouflons which inhabit Nakhichevan and western slopes of the Greater Caucasus in Balakan, Qabala, Zaqatala and Ismayilli regions.  
Jeyran gazelles are among the rarest and fastest species in the Caucasus. These species can only be found in Shirvan State Reserve, Bendovan and Korchay regions of Azerbaijan.

Insectivores
Eastern European hedgehog, Erinaceus concolor
Northern white-breasted hedgehog, Erinaceus roumanicos
Long-eared hedgehog, Hemiechinus auritus
Levantine mole, Talpa levantis
Gueldenstaedt's shrew, Crocidura gueldenstaedti
Bicolored shrew, Crocidura leucodon
Transcaucasian water shrew, Neomys schelkovnikovi
White-toothed pygmy shrew, Suncus etruscus
Caspian shrew, Crocidura caspica

Bats
European free-tailed bat, Tadarida teniotis
Common pipistrelle, Pipistrellus pipistrellus
Kuhl's pipistrelle, Pipistrellus kuhlii
Lesser mouse-eared bat, Myotis blythii
Whiskered bat, Myotis mystacinus
Serotine bat, Eptesicus serotinus
Lesser horseshoe bat, Rhinolophus hipposideros
Greater horseshoe bat, Rhinolophus ferrumequinum
Botta's serotine bat, Eptesicus bottae
Mehely's horseshoe bat, Rhinolophus mehelyi
Geoffroy's bat, Myotis emarginatus
Brown long-eared bat, Plecotus auritus
Noctule bat, Nyctalus noctula
Savi's pipistrelle, Hypsugo savii
Nathusius's pipistrelle, Pipistrellus nathusii
Parti-coloured bat, Vespertilio murinus
Bent-wing bat, Miniopterus schreibersii
Mediterranean horseshoe bat, Rhinolophus euryale
Blasius' horseshoe bat, Rhinolophus blasii
Natterer's bat, Myotis nattereri
Eastern barbastelle bat, Barbastella leucomelas
Western barbastelle bat, Barbastella barbastellus
Bechstein's bat, Myotis bechsteinii
Grey long-eared bat, Plecotus austriacus
Leisler's bat, Nyctalus leisleri
Northern bat, Eptesicus nilssonii
Soprano pipistrelle, Pipistrellus pygmaeus

Lagomorphs
European hare, Lepus europaeus
European rabbit, Oryctolagus cuniculus

Rodents
House mouse, Mus musculus
Brown rat, Rattus norvegicus (introduced)
Pigmy field mouse, Apodemus uralensis
Yellow-breasted mouse, Apodemus fulvipectus
Grey hamster, Cricetulus migratorius
Water vole, Arvicola terrestris
Social vole, Microtus socialis
Small five-toed jerboa, Allactaga elater
Euphrates jerboa, Allactaga euphratica
Libyan jird, Meriones libycus
Tristram's jird, Meriones tristami
Persian jird, Meriones persicus
Vinogradov's jird, Meriones vinogradovi
Midday gerbil, Meriones meridianus
Turkish hamster, Mesocricetus brandti
Azerbaijani mouse-like hamster, Calomyscus urartensis
Transcaucasian mole vole, Ellobius lutescens
House mouse, Mus abbotti
Fat dormouse, Glis glis
Forest dormouse, Dryomys nitedula
Common vole, Microtus arvalis
Snow vole, Chionomys nivalis
Caucasian snow vole, Chionomys gud
Robert's snow vole, Chionomys roberti
Black Sea field mouse, Apodemus ponticus
Striped field mouse, Apodemus agrarius
Harvest mouse, Micromys minutus
Schelkovnikov's pine vole, Microtus schelkovnikovi
Caucasus field mouse, Apodemus hyrcanicus
Daghestan pine vole, Microtus daghestanicus
Major's pine vole, Microtus majori
Nasarov's vole, Microtus nasarovi
Persian squirrel, Sciurus anomalus
Red squirrel, Sciurus vulgaris
Indian porcupine, Hystrix leucura
Roof rat, Rattus rattus
Coypu, Myocastor coypus

Carnivores

Grey wolf, Canis lupus
Caspian Sea wolf, Canis lupus campestris
Golden jackal, Canis aureus
Red fox, Vulpes vulpes
Beech marten, Martes foina
Caucasian badger, Meles canescens
Least weasel, Mustela nivalis
European otter, Lutra lutra
Eurasian lynx, Lynx lynx
Brown bear, Ursus arctos
Striped hyena, Hyaena hyaena
Pine marten, Martes martes
European wildcat, Felis silvestris
Marbled polecat, Vormela peregusna
Jungle cat, Felis chaus
Persian leopard, Panthera pardus saxicolor
Raccoon, Procyon lotor (introduced)
Extinct are:
Asiatic cheetah since the 18th century
Caspian tiger since the beginning of the 20th century
Asiatic lion since the Middle Ages

Pinnipeds
Caspian seal, Pusa caspica

Even-toed ungulates
Wild boar, Sus scrofa
Moose, Alces alces (extirpated)
Roe deer, Capreolus capreolus
Red deer, Cervus elaphus
Goitered gazelle, Gazella subgutturosa
Chamois, Rupicapra rupicapra
Wild goat, Capra aegagrus
Asiatic mouflon, Ovis orientalis
East Caucasian tur, Capra cylindricornis
Aurochs, Bos primigenius (extinct)
European bison, Bison bonasus (extirpated)

Fish

The country's fresh water basins and the Caspian Sea account for 97 species of fish, eight of which were introduced and seven of these have become widespread. There are also over 15 thousand species of invertebrates in Azerbaijan. Most can be found in the Kur River, its surrounding lakes, as well as in the Mingechevir reservoir. Most of fish are anadromous or semi-anadromous (the young grow up in salt water and migrate to fresh water to breed after they reach maturity). The most valuable of the anadromous fish are salmon, sturgeon, stellate sturgeon and beluga. Aspius, Chalcalburnus and eel are also anadromous fish. Sturgeon meat and caviar are highly valuable. Furthermore, the water basins of Azerbaijan contain other valuable fish species such as bream, sazan, rutilus kutum and others. Herring can also be found in the Caspian sea, and is regularly fished. Due to the construction of a number of hydrotechnical plants on the Kur river after 1959, the regulation of the river water flow, as well as the Caspian water pollution led to the significant reduction in the number of valuable fish species. Three hatcheries (Kuragzi, Alibayramli and Kur experimental sturgeon hatchery) for melioration and fish-farming purposes were launched to restore the fish reserves and to increase the number of fish species. Azerbaijan's fish farming establishments and hatcheries account for breeding of 20 million sturgeons, 600 thousand salmons, over 800 thousand. A new hatchery with the capacity of 20 million sturgeons was put in commission in Khyly in 2000.

Birds

Azerbaijan has a rich avifauna. There are 363 species of birds recorded from about 60 families. Around 40% of the species are settled in Azerbaijan, 27% of these species winter in the country, and 10% pass through Azerbaijan during the migration period. One of the notable bird species is the golden eagle which inhabits mainly mountainous areas such as Nakhichevan. The golden eagle has been printed on dozens of stamps and cards in Azerbaijan.

Other
Ten species of amphibians from five families are recorded in Azerbaijan. There are 52 species of reptiles found in Azerbaijan. Most of these species are found in semi-desert areas in Shamakhi and Nakhichevan. Few are found in other lowlands or mountainous areas.

Flora

Azerbaijan has a rich flora. Over 4,500 species of higher plants have been registered in the country. Due to the a variety of climates and biomes in Azerbaijan, the flora is more diverse than in other republics of the South Caucasus. Approximately 67% of the flora species found in the whole of Caucasus can be found in Azerbaijan.

The diversity of Azerbaijan's flora and vegetation is the result of the varied physical-geographic and natural-historic conditions, as well as Azerbaijan's history of being influenced by the remote floristic regions.

Trees and plants
Relict genera of the tertiary period can be frequently found in all the zones of Azerbaijan, especially in Lenkeran (Talysh regions). They are the iron tree (Parrotia persica), the Lenkoran acacia (Albizia julibrissin), the basket oak (Quercus castaneifolia), the Caucasian persimmon (Diospyros lotus), the evergreen shrub of Ruscus hyrcana, the box tree (Buxus hyrcana), etc. There are 240 endemic species of plants in Azerbaijan.

90.5% of the Altyaghach National Park is covered by broad-leaved forests, the predominant types of tree are the iron tree, Caucasus hornbeam, oriental beech (Fagus orientalis), and birch.

Reserves

Several reserves have been established in Azerbaijan in order to preserve fauna, flora and other ecosystems:
 Goy-Gol State Reserve
 Gyzylaghadj State Reserve
 Zagatala State Reserve
 Turyanchay State Reserve
 Pirgulu State Reserve
 Shirvan State Reserve
 Besitchay State Reserve
 Qarayazy State Reserve
 Ismayilly State Reserve
 Qaragol State Reserve
 Ilisu State Reserve
 Shahbuz State Reserve
 Eldar pine-tree State Reserve

See also
 List of mammals of Azerbaijan
 Nature of Azerbaijan
 Karabakh
 National Parks of Azerbaijan
 State Reserves of Azerbaijan

References

External links

Azerbaijan
Biota of Azerbaijan